This was the first edition of the tournament.

Roberto Maytín and Andrés Molteni won the title, defeating Guillermo Durán and Máximo González in the final, 6–2, 3–6, [10–8].

Seeds

Draw

Draw

References
 Main Draw

Challenger Team Città di Padova - Doubles